Mark Burton may refer to:
 Mark Burton (politician) (born 1956), New Zealand politician
 Mark Burton (footballer) (born 1974), New Zealand football (soccer) player
 Mark Burton (filmmaker) (born 1960), British film and television screenwriter, producer and director
 Mark Burton (bishop), Anglican Dean of Melbourne, 2009–2012